Pierre Legendre may refer to:

 Pierre Legendre (historian), French historian and psychoanalyst
 Pierre Legendre (ecologist), Canadian numerical ecologist